Statistics Netherlands, founded in 1899, is a Dutch governmental institution that gathers statistical information about the Netherlands. In Dutch it is known as the Centraal Bureau voor de Statistiek (Central Agency for Statistics), often abbreviated to CBS. It is located in The Hague and Heerlen. Since 3 January 2004, Statistics Netherlands has been a self-standing organisation, or quango. Its independent status in law guarantees the reliable collection and dissemination of information supporting public debate, policy development and decision-making.

The CBS collects statistical information about, amongst others: 
 Count of the population
 Consumer pricing
 Economic growth
 Income of persons and households
 Unemployment
 Religion

The CBS carries out a program that needs to be ratified by the Central Commission for Statistics. This commission was replaced in 2016 by an Advisory Board. This independent board must guard the impartiality, independence, quality, relevance, and continuity of the CBS, according to the Law on the CBS of 1996 (Wet op het Centraal bureau en de Centrale commissie voor de statistiek) and 2003.

History

CBS was established in 1899 in response to the need for independent and reliable information that advances the understanding of social issues and supports public decision making. This is still the main role of CBS. Philip Idenburg, who worked at the CBS from 1929–1966, played a key role in salvaging the work of the Mundaneum offices in The Hague, arranging for Gerd Arntz to be involved in setting up the Dutch Foundation for Statistics, which used the Isotypes previously developed by Arntz and Otto Neurath.

Offices
The CBS has offices in The Hague and Heerlen. The office in Heerlen was located there by the government in 1973 to compensate the area for the loss of ten of thousands of jobs because of closing the coal mines. The office in The Hague with the name 'Double U' was designed by Branimir Medić and Pero Puljiz. The office in Heerlen was designed by Meyer en Van Schooten Architects in 2009. Glass was used everywhere in the building. The main hall has a glass roof and the outside walls are fully glass. The several straight staircases in the main hall have glass balustrades with a RVS handrail and were manufactured by EeStairs. Queen Beatrix of the Netherlands officially opened the building on 30 September 2009.

See also
Eurostat

References

External links

Statistics Netherlands
StatLine database

Netherlands
Economy of the Netherlands
Independent government agencies of the Netherlands
Organisations based in The Hague
Buildings and structures in Heerlen
Buildings and structures in The Hague